Gornja Topla Reber is a remote abandoned settlement in the Municipality of Kočevje in southern Slovenia. The area is part of the traditional region of Lower Carniola and is now included in the Southeast Slovenia Statistical Region. Its territory is now part of the village of Topla Reber.

Name
The shared part of the names means 'warm slope', referring to the geographical position of the settlements on a sun-exposed southwest-facing slope. The semantically corresponding German names Oberwarmberg and Unterwarmberg share the same contrastive relation.

History
Gornja Topla Reber was a village inhabited by Gottschee Germans. In the winter of 1941–1942 one of the first Partisan bases in the Kočevje area was established in the vicinity. The settlement was burned by Italian troops on 14 August 1942 during the Rog Offensive. Together with Dolnja Topla Reber, it was merged into the settlement of Topla Reber in 1955.

References

External links
Gornja Topla Reber on Geopedia
Pre–World War II list of oeconyms and family names in Gornja Topla Reber

Former populated places in the Municipality of Kočevje